The Zhengzhou Shang City is an archaeological site of the Bronze Age Erligang culture in Zhengzhou, Henan, China. Studies give it 4 chronological phases from 1630 to 1400 BC. The excavation of the site is of great importance in understanding the history of the dynasty. It is also one of the oldest archeological sites in China.

It was probably a capital of the Shang Dynasty, but of which of the several capitals was not certain.

Excavations
Archaeologist Han Weizhou discovered the site in 1950. In the spring of 1951, a group of archaeologists from the Institute of Archaeology, Chinese Academy of Sciences came to research in Zhengzhou. They collected some specimens and confirmed that it was indeed of Shang dynasty, and older than the Shang city of Yinxu in Anyang.

Erligang is the type site of Erligang culture. This is the area located outside the giant walls of the ancient city. Starting in 1952, the first formal archaeological excavations at Erligang began. Also the east area of Luoyang was explored. In 1954, the archaeologist An Jinhuai and staff conducted a large-scale excavation in this area. The site of the city walls was identified to be of Shang dynasty in 1955. The living area of the royal families was found in the northeast part of Shang City. The excavation was forced to stop because of the Cultural Revolution.

In 1971, An Jinhuai reorganized the archaeological group to continue excavations when he had a chance to go back to Zhengzhou. In 1973, they found ruins of many buildings of differing sizes made of hangtu. This turned out to be the palace area. Archaeologists found numerous other sites in this area. The excavations are difficult because the modern city covers most of the ancient city area.

Layout
The city was rectangular in form. The perimeter of the inner city walls was around 6,960 meters, with 11 gaps that might be city gates. The north wall was about 1,690 meters in length, the west about 1,870 meters, while the south and east were both about 1,700 meters. The palaces were located in the northeast of the city and inside were water storage facilities made of stones. There were also smaller buildings believed to be where slaves lived. Recent archaeological findings include the existence of an outer city and wall. Large workshops were located in the outer city, including a bone workshop, a pottery workshop and two bronze vessel workshops.

References

Archaeological sites in China
Buildings and structures in Zhengzhou
Shang dynasty
Major National Historical and Cultural Sites in Henan
1950 archaeological discoveries
Tourist attractions in Zhengzhou